Sharkskin is a generic term used to describe a woven or warp-knitted fabric that imitates a shark's skin. The lines run from lower left to upper right on the face of the fabric . Sharkskin fabric in woven category varies with plain, basket and twill weave formations, It is typically made with acetate and rayon yarns, as well as with worsted wool and various synthetic blends. The combination of color of the yarns and twill weaving pattern in which the colored threads run diagonal to the white yarns, results in the finish for which sharkskin fabric is known. It has smooth but crisp texture and two tone lustrous appearance. Lightweight and wrinkle-free, sharkskin is ideal for curtains, tablecloths and napkins. Sharkskin fabric is popular for both men’s and women’s worsted suits, light winter jackets and coats. Sharkskin is commonly used as a liner in diving suits and wetsuits.

Composition 

Sharkskin has historically been made with different types of natural fibers, including either mohair, wool and silk.

More expensive variations, often demarcated by fabric content labels bearing "Golden Fleece", "Royal" or the like, indicate an extremely rare and costly "sharkskin" of yester-year. Those fabrics, produced in small quantities, were manufactured in South America (Peru and Argentina: by transplanted German/Italian weavers) from the 1950s and 60s and are known to include in some instances even small percentages of vicuna, guanaco or alpaca in such blends: inclusion of silk (then a very costly fiber) was even more common among the "natural sharkskin". Whereas, "artificial sharkskin", a much less costly substitute, is a fabric variant that is more often found from that period and can contain synthesized or synthetic fibers that were developed contemporary to those eras.

Artificial variations

Artificial sharkskin variants used for suiting first appeared in the 1950s and rapidly garnered worldwide appeal in artificial sharkskin (costing much less than its "natural" counterpart: which most consumers were not aware existed, so far out of their price range it remained), attaining broad popularity in the early 1960s and the disco era of the late 70s, followed by brief fashion resurgences in the mid-1980s, mid-1990s and late 2000s: its variations often contain some wool percentage blend. More recently, such artificial sharkskin fabrics have undergone technological improvements and have attained new desirability, even among "fabric purists" who would have conventionally rejected out-of-hand any "artificial sharkskin" substitutes for the real item containing a majority percentage of mohair.

The term "Super-Sharkskin" has been used to describe relatively costly sharkskin fabrics which include some percentage of synthetic fibers. The addition of synthetics can create a heightened metallic-like sheen, and/or added flexibility (as with a 2% Lycra blend).

Fashionability
Many attribute the "fading in and out of fashion" of sharkskin of any sort to the fact that many of the ubiquitous "artificial sharkskin" variants had "created an indelible public impression that all sharkskin ought to be deemed "tacky", to be eschewed, as it is in Lisa Birnbach's Official Preppy Handbook, 1980, which reflected, and in itself, in turn, influenced, many consumers' misgivings regarding its social status. From the late 2000s until the mid 2010s, three piece sharkskin "shiny suits", sometimes incorporating a contrasting shawl collar, briefly became fashionable in America and Australia due to a resurgence of interest in the early 1960s fashions depicted in Mad Men.

Importantly, whether "natural" or "artificial", today the line between the two has been blurred by the advance of innovative blends. Nonetheless, "natural sharkskin" from the 1950s and 1960s men's and women's suits remain highly sought in the vintage clothing market, commanding extraordinary prices online. The most desired sharkskin colors feature a peacock iridescent palette.

Middle East
British Diplomat Sir Terence Clark in the 1950s served in Bahrain. He reminisces that the requisite winter evening wear for a diplomat was a white sharkskin dinner jacket.  Lucette Lagnado in her prize-winning memoir about her childhood, The Man in the White Sharkskin Suit: My Family's Exodus from Old Cairo to the New World uses the imagery of the white sharkskin suit to evoke the glamorous evening life in Egypt in the 1950s. Early in Justine, Lawrence Durrell mentions the heroine sitting in front of a multi-panel mirror trying out a sharkskin dress; the book is set in the high society of diplomats and businessmen in Alexandria in the 1930s, a city where Durrell spent much time during World War II, a few years later.

See also 

 Shot silk

References 

Woven fabrics